Julie Harrington may refer to:

Julie Harrington (singer), British singer/songwriter
Julie Harrington (tennis) (born 1962), American tennis player